Pelagia, distinguished as Pelagia of Antioch, Pelagia the Penitent, and Pelagia the Harlot, was a Christian saint and hermit in the 4th or 5th century. Her feast day was celebrated on 8 October, originally in common with Saints Pelagia the Virgin and Pelagia of Tarsus. Pelagia died as a result of extreme asceticism, which had emaciated her to the point she could no longer be recognized. According to Orthodox tradition, she was buried in her cell. Upon the discovery that the renowned monk had been a woman, the holy fathers tried to keep it a secret, but the gossip spread and her relics drew pilgrims from as far off as Jericho and the Jordan valley.

Legend
Pelagia's story is attributed to James or Jacob, deacon of the church of Heliopolis (modern Baalbek). He states that Margarita was the "foremost actress" and a prominent harlot in Antioch. During one of the city's church councils, she passed by on a donkey surrounded by her entourage and a "worldly crowd". Perfumed and "immodestly bareheaded", the outlines of her body were "clearly visible" beneath her gold cloth, pearls, and precious stones, which ran from her bare shoulders to her feet. Most of the fathers were shamed into looking away, but the bishop Nonnus stared openly and confessed himself "delighted". Mocking his fellows, he condemned both them and himself for taking less care of their souls than she had of her body.

She appeared at his next Sunday sermon and Nonnus's sermon on hell and the goodness of paradise prompted her to repent. She had two of her slaves trail Nonnus to his residence and then wrote him on wax tablets, calling herself "sinful" and a "servant of the devil" but seeking mercy from God, who "came down to earth not for the sake of the righteous but to save sinners". Nonnus replied to the anonymous request that God knew her and her past and that he would receive her, but only in the presence of the other bishops.

She went to the basilica of Saint Julian to see them; when Nonnus demanded surety that she would not return to her former life, she fell to the ground and threatened that if she were refused admission to the Church, all her future sins would be held against him at his judgment. The archbishop was informed and sent the deaconess Romana to clothe her in the baptismal gown. Nonnus took her confession and baptized "Margarita" under her birth name Pelagia, with Romana serving as her godmother.

The devil shortly afterward arrived to complain, but was driven off when Pelagia made the Sign of the Cross and breathed upon him. He returned the next night to renew his complaints and was driven off the same way. On the third day, Pelagia directed her steward to inventory her possessions. She then turned them over to Nonnus, who disbursed them to the widows, orphans, and poor of the city. She freed her slaves, male and female, "taking their golden torcs off with her own hands". She then began living with Romana.

The night before it came time to remove her baptismal gown, she stole out in the dark wearing one of Nonnus's chitons. She headed for Jerusalem, where she built a cell on the Mount of Olives. She lived there for three or four years, disguising herself as a male recluse and eunuch under the name Pelagi. She then died, apparently as a result of extreme asceticism, which had emaciated her to the point she could no longer be recognized. According to Orthodox tradition, Pelagia was buried in her cell. Upon the discovery that the renowned monk had been a woman, the "holy fathers" tried to keep it a secret, but the gossip spread and her relics drew pilgrims from as far off as Jericho and the Jordan valley.

The story appeared in the Greek Menaea. It significantly omits dates and (on eight occasions) the name of the archbishop under whom Nonnus served.

History
The historical St Pelagia, mentioned by St Ambrose and in two sermons by John Chrysostom, was an Antiochene virgin who was martyred because of her refusal to offer pagan sacrifice during the Diocletianic Persecution. Chrysostom's  sermon also mentions an anonymous (but apparently famous) actress and prostitute "from a wicked city in Phoenice" (possibly Heliopolis) who seduced "the empress's brother" but converted "in our own day". Constantius II's wife Eusebia had two brothers, Eusebius and Hypatius, joint consuls in 359, who both lived for many years in Antioch. In his account, attempts were made to lure her back to her former life by the Roman prefect and some of his soldiers, a role played by Satan in the hagiography.

Similar other accounts

Saint Marina, the Latin equivalent of "Pelagia", was another bride who disguised herself as a monk, in her case to escape an unwanted marriage. Aspects of their stories were apparently combined with apocryphal accounts of Mary Magdalene, Biblical accounts of Solomon and the Queen of Sheba and of Jesus and various women in the New Testament.

See also
 Saints Margaret the Virgin and Marina the Monk, both of whom are sometimes confused or conflated with Pelagia
 The Jerusalem tomb venerated since the Byzantine times as Pelagia's
 Saint Pelagia, patron saint archive
 Agia Pelagia, village in Crete where Pelagia is venerated and a local legend mentions people finding her icon in a cave

Notes

References

Citations

Bibliography

 .
 .
 .
 .
 .
 Jacobus Diaconus, The Life of Saint Pelagia the Harlot, English translations from the Latin available online:
 Translation by Sr. Benedicta Ward, S.L.G., "Pelagia, Beauty Riding By" in Harlots of the desert: a study of repentance in early monastic sources. (Cistercian Publications, Inc., series: Cistercian Studies (Book 106), Kalamazoo, 1986. .): Latin Text in PL 73, 663–672)
 Translation by Revd Benedict Baker, Bronllys, UK. Accessed on 25 July 2018.
 Orthodox Classics in English, "The Eighth Day of the Month of October: The Life of Our Holy Mother Pelagia the Nun, who was Once a Harlot, Written by James, a Deacon of the Church of Heliopolis, from The Great Collection of the Lives of the Saints, Vol. 2: October, compiled by Saint Demetrius of Rostov". Chrysostom Press, House Springs. Archive copy accessed on 25 July 2018.
 
 . 

4th-century Roman women
4th-century Christian saints
4th-century Byzantine monks
5th-century Byzantine monks
Syrian Christian saints
Late Ancient Christian female saints
Hermits in the Roman Empire
Cross-dressing saints
Female prostitutes
5th-century Roman women
Deaths by starvation
Ancient actresses
Ancient Roman actors
Ancient Roman courtesans
People from Antioch
Legendary Romans